Charles William Jacob  (24 January 1921 – 1 June 2015) was a stockbroker in the City of London who was a pioneer and promoter of ethical investment.

Jacob was born into poverty in Hornsey, north London, and became a Methodist at a young age. After working his way up from office boy, he became a stockbroker specialising in gilt-edged and fixed-interest stocks. In 1972 he was asked to manage the Methodist Church's investment fund and his interest in ethical investment developed from there. He became a director of a number of investment companies and was the director and patron of the UK Sustainable Investment & Finance Association.

Jacob was a Methodist preacher. He was made MBE in 1988, and CBE in 2011.

References 

People from Hornsey
Ethical investment
English Methodists
1921 births
2015 deaths
English money managers
Commanders of the Order of the British Empire
English stockbrokers
20th-century English businesspeople